Back in the Circus (2004) is the fourth studio album released by Jonatha Brooke.

The track "Less Than Love is Nothing", written with Eric Bazilian, is the first co-written song Brooke has included on a solo album. Additionally, this is her first album to feature cover version of other bands' songs: "Fire and Rain", "God Only Knows", and "Eye in the Sky".

Track listing
All songs written by Jonatha Brooke unless otherwise noted.

 "Back in the Circus" – 4:21
 "Better After All" – 2:43
 "It Matters Now" – 3:59
 "Sleeping with the Light On" – 3:12
 "Fire and Rain" (James Taylor cover) – 4:13
 "Everything I Wanted" – 4:11
 "God Only Knows" (The Beach Boys cover) – 3:00
 "Less Than Love is Nothing" (Brooke/Bazilian) – 3:47
 "Sally" – 3:57
 "No Net Below" – 3:05
 "Eye in the Sky" (The Alan Parsons Project cover) – 4:53

References

2004 albums
Jonatha Brooke albums
Bad Dog Records albums